The 44th Golden Horse Awards (Mandarin:第44屆金馬獎) took place on December 8, 2007 at Taipei Arena in Taipei, Taiwan.

References

44th
2007 film awards
2007 in Taiwan